Sam's Boy is a 1922 British silent comedy film directed by Manning Haynes and starring Johnny Butt, Tom Coventry and Bobbie Rudd.

Cast
 Johnny Butt as Captain Hart  
 Tom Coventry as Sam Brown 
 Bobbie Rudd as Billy Jones  
 Charles Ashton Harry Green  
 Toby Cooper as Charlie Legge  
 Mary Braithwaite as Mrs. Hunt  
 Kate Gurney as Mrs. Brown  
 Harry Newman  as Mate

References

Bibliography
 Goble, Alan. The Complete Index to Literary Sources in Film. Walter de Gruyter, 1999.

External links

1922 films
British silent feature films
British comedy films
Films directed by H. Manning Haynes
British black-and-white films
1922 comedy films
1920s English-language films
1920s British films
Silent comedy films